The Roman Catholic Diocese of Mzuzu is the Roman Catholic diocese located in Mzuzu in Malawi.  It is in the Ecclesiastical Province of the Archdiocese of Lilongwe.

History

 May 8, 1947: Established as Apostolic Prefecture of Northern Nyassa from the Apostolic Vicariate of Nyassa 
 January 17, 1961: Promoted as Diocese of Mzuzu

Bishops
 Prefects Apostolic of Northern Nyassa (Roman rite)
 Fr. Marcello Saint-Denis, M. Afr. (1947.06.13 – 1957)
 Fr. Jean-Louis Jobidon, M. Afr. (1958.01.03 – 1961.01.17 see below)
Bishops of Mzuzu (Roman rite)
Bishop Jean-Louis Jobidon, M. Afr. (see above 1961.01.17 – 1987.10.01)
Bishop Joseph Mukasa Zuza (1995.03.03 - 2015.01.15)
Bishop John Alphonsus Ryan S.P.S. (2016.04.26 - )

Other priest of this diocese who became bishop
Martin Anwel Mtumbuka, appointed Bishop of Karonga in 2010

See also
Roman Catholicism in Malawi

References

External links
GCatholic.org

Mzuzu
Christian organizations established in 1947
Roman Catholic dioceses and prelatures established in the 20th century
1947 establishments in Nyasaland
Roman Catholic Ecclesiastical Province of Lilongwe